Jas Arora is an Indian model and Bollywood actor, best known for his appearance in the music video "Gur Naalo Ishq Mitha" (1998). He comes from a Punjabi background.

Present
Jas has collaborated with an Italian brand named Tod's.

Acting career

Filmography
 Main Solah Baras Ki (1998) as Sunil Sethi
 Dushman (1998) as Kabir Suraj
 Monsoon Wedding (2001) as Umang Chadha
 Danger (2002) as Saurabh
 Chalte Chalte (2003) as Sameer
 Pyaar Ke Side Effects (2006) as Vivek Chaddha
 Ek Paheli Leela (2015) as Prince Bikram
 Freaky Ali (2016) as Vikram Rathore

Television
 Tamanna House (2004) as Dilip
 Achar! (2004–05) as Ajay Chhabria
 Dharti Ka Veer Yodha Prithviraj Chauhan (2006) as Someshwar
 Ssshhhh...Phir Koi Hai  (2007) as Thakur

Music videos
 Gur Naalo Ishq Mitha (1998)
 Mera Laung Gawacha (1998)
 Yaaro Sab Dua Karo (1998)

References

External links
 

Male actors from Punjab, India
Male actors in Hindi cinema
Living people
Indian male models
Punjabi people
1969 births